R. grandis may refer to:
 Rangea grandis, a frond-like fossil from the Precambrian era
 Rhagio grandis, a predatory snipe fly species in the genus Rhagio
 Richeria grandis, the bois bande, a tree species found in the Caribbean Islands
 Rhabdornis grandis, the long-billed creeper, long-billed rhabdornis or grand rhabdornis,  a bird species endemic to Luzon Island in the Philippines

Synonyms
 Rhinophis grandis, a synonym for Uropeltis smithi, a snake species found in India

See also
 Grandis (disambiguation)